North Glengarry is a township in eastern Ontario, Canada, in the United Counties of Stormont, Dundas and Glengarry. It is a predominantly elderly invaded rural area located between Ottawa-Gatineau, Montreal and Cornwall.

Communities
The township of North Glengarry comprises a number of villages and hamlets, including the following communities:

 Kenyon Township: Apple Hill, Dominionville, Dunvegan, Greenfield, Maxville (population 853); Athol, Baltic Corners, Dornie, Fiskes Corners, Fassifern, Guaytown, Laggan, McCrimmon, St. Elmo, Stewarts Glen; Fairview, Skye
 Lochiel Township: Alexandria (population 3,287), Dalkeith, Glen Robertson, Glen Sandfield, Lochiel; Breadalbane, Brodie, Kirkhill, Lochinvar, Lorne, McCormick, Pine Grove

The township administrative offices are located in Alexandria.

Alexandria is served five or six times a day by the Montreal-Ottawa Via Rail trains which almost all stop at Alexandria station in each direction.  Commuter buses provide daily services from Maxville and area to Ottawa-Gatineau. Maxville was served by Via Rail until October 2011.

History

The area was originally settled in 1792 as part of the historic Glengarry County in which many Scottish emigrants settled from all over the Scottish Highlands due to the Highland Clearances. This first wave of heavy migration lasted till 1816, emigration still continued afterwards into the early 20th century but in a slower pace. Many of these migrants came from the Inverness-shire area of Scotland specifically. Canadian Gaelic / Scottish Gaelic has been a spoken language in the area for over four centuries [1792?]. Kenyon, which was part of Charlottenburgh Township until 1798, was named for British judge and politician Lloyd Kenyon, 1st Baron Kenyon, and Lochiel, which was part of Lancaster Township until 1818, was named for the Lochiels of Clan Cameron.

Alexandria and its nucleus Priest's Mill, built in 1819, were named for the Catholic priest Alexander Macdonell, who resided at St. Raphael's and later became the first bishop of Kingston.

Development in the region was significantly spurred by the development of a railway link between Ottawa and Montreal in the early 1880s. Maxville, Alexandria and Glen Robertson, in particular, became key railway hubs for farmers in the area.

Maxville was first incorporated as a village separate from Kenyon Township in 1892, and Alexandria was separated from Lochiel Township in the early 1900s.

The township of North Glengarry was established on January 1, 1998, with the amalgamation of the former townships of Kenyon and Lochiel, along with the village of Maxville and the town of Alexandria.

Demographics 

Culture

Maxville (population 853) hosts the annual Glengarry Highland Games, one of North America's largest festivals of Scottish culture, on the first long weekend in August. The Glengarry Highland Games include traditional Scottish events such as the caber toss, tug of war, and the sheaf toss.

Maxville hosts a country fair at the end of June that include a classic and new automobile show, homecraft prizes, Western performances, a holstein show including 4-H showmanship, a hunter horse and hunter pony show, a talent show, a midway, laser tag and a demolition derby.

Sport
The Alexandria Glens of the Central Canada Hockey League Tier 2 play at the Glengarry Sports Palace (Billy Gebbie Arena) in Alexandria. The Glens Join the CCHL2 new league in 2015. The Glens played in the Eastern Ontario Junior B Hockey League until 2014-15 Season.

The Glens won the 2007 EOJBHL Championship, defeating the Gatineau Mustangs in 7 games in the final. This marks the first time a team outside of the Metro Division of EOJBHL has won the Carson Trophy as league champions in over half a decade. This marks the Glens first Junior "B" Championship.

The Glens won the 2008 EOJBHL Championship, defeating the Ottawa West Golden Knights in 6 games in the final. This marks the first time a team the St-Lawrence Division has won the Carson Trophy back to back as league champions. This marks the Glens Second Junior "B" Championship.

The Maxville Mustangs of the Eastern Ontario Junior C Hockey League used to play in Maxville.

See also
 Transit Eastern Ontario operated under the authority of The North Glengarry Prescott Russell (NGPR) Transport Board
List of townships in Ontario
List of francophone communities in Ontario

References

External links

Lower-tier municipalities in Ontario
Municipalities in the United Counties of Stormont, Dundas and Glengarry
Township municipalities in Ontario